The Vietnamese leopard gecko or Chinese tiger gecko (Goniurosaurus araneus) is a species of lizards in the family Eublepharidae. It is endemic to the Cao Bằng Province of Vietnam. The scientific species name, is from the Latin, aranea, which means "spider", due to the spindly, spider-like form of this species.

Description
The Vietnamese tiger gecko is dark gray in color and has many black spots and four wide orange bands across the back. Its eyes are dark reddish brown. Goniurosaurus araneus is distinguished from other species of the same genus by its elongated dorsal scales. This gecko has a maximum length (including tail) of 190 mm.

Habitat
The habitat of the Vietnamese tiger gecko is primarily rocky. It is found in humid and shady areas and in mountainous terrain or near caves.

References

Further reading
Bobrov V.V., Semenov D.V. (2008). Lizards of Vietnam [in Russian]. Moscow, 236 pp.
Dickhoff, A. 2004. Ein Tiger im Terrarium - Haltung und Nachzucht von Goniurosaurus araneus (GRISMER, VIETS & BOYLE 1999). Draco 5 (18): 76-81
Grismer, et al. (1999) Journal of Herpetology 33 (3):382-393.
Grismer, L. Lee, Brian E. Viets and Lawrence J. Boyle. 1999. Two new continental species of Goniurosaurus (Squamata: Eublepharidae) with a phylogeny and evolutionary classification of the genus. Journal of Herpetology 33 (3): 382-393.
Grismer, L. Lee, Shi Haitao, Nicolai L. Orlov and Natalia B. Ananjeva 2002. A new species of Goniurosaurus (Squamata: Eublepharidae) from Hainan Island, China. Journal of Herpetology 36 (2): 217-224.
Jonniaux P, Kumazawa Y. (2008). Molecular phylogenetic and dating analyses using mitochondrial DNA sequences of eyelid geckos (Squamata: Eublepharidae). Gene. 15 January 2008;407(1-2):105-115.
Rösler, H. 2000. Kommentierte Liste der rezent, subrezent und fossil bekannten Geckotaxa (Reptilia: Gekkonomorpha). Gekkota 2: 28-153.
Seufer, H.; Y. Kaverkin & A. Kirschner (eds.) 2005. Die Lidgeckos. Kirschner und Seufer Verlag, 238 pp.
Ziegler, T.; Truong, N.Q.; Schmitz, A.; Stenke, R. & Rösler, H. 2008. A new species of Goniurosaurus from Cat Ba Island, Hai Phong, northern Vietnam (Squamata: Eublepharidae). Zootaxa 1771: 16–30.

Reptiles described in 1999
Reptiles of Vietnam
Endemic fauna of Vietnam
Cao Bằng province
Goniurosaurus